Arnaud Josserand (born ) is a former French male volleyball player. He was part of the France men's national volleyball team at the 1990 FIVB Volleyball Men's World Championship in Brazil and 1992 Summer Olympics.

References

1963 births
Living people
French men's volleyball players
Place of birth missing (living people)
Olympic volleyball players of France
Volleyball players at the 1992 Summer Olympics